Hillary Hartley is an American technologist and government official who has served in both local and federal government in the US, and in the Canadian province of Ontario.

She is currently the Chief Digital and Data Officer and Deputy Minister for Digital Government, Cabinet Office, for the province of Ontario, the first person to hold this position, taking office in April 2017. As the head of the Ontario Digital Service, based within the Treasury Board Secretariat, she is responsible for leading the provincial government's digital transformation efforts and for operationalizing the Simpler, Faster, Better Services Act of 2019. As part of her role, she also chairs the government's Digital Government Board.

Prior to her role in Ontario, she was a co-founder and Deputy Executive Director of 18F, a digital services agency within the United States federal government based within the General Services Administration. She had been a Presidential Innovation Fellow working on the MyUSA service, and together with a group of former fellows founded 18F in March 2014 under the Obama administration.

She previously worked as Director of Integrated Marketing at government technology vendor NIC, created the first nationwide polling place lookup site MyPollingPlace.com during the 2004 federal election cycle, and earlier in her career worked as a web designer for Arkansas.gov.

She has been involved in a variety of community-based events in the government space, including eDemocracyCamp, TranparencyCamp, Gov2.0Camp, and CityCamp. Following the passage of Prop 8 in California, she co-founded Equality Camp, an event to bring technologists together with activists for marriage equality and LGBT rights.

As an early adopter of Twitter, she has used the handle @hillary since 2006, which has caused confusion and attracted misdirected mentions intended for Hillary Clinton.

Personal life and education 
She holds a Bachelor's in Sociology from Smith College in Massachusetts.

She publicly identifies as gay, and lives with her wife and two children in Toronto, Ontario.

References 

Living people
Smith College alumni
Canadian civil servants
Year of birth missing (living people)